The Midsummer Station - Acoustic is an extended play by the American electronica project Owl City that was released on July 30, 2013. It is Owl City's third EP following Shooting Star.

The EP contains acoustic versions of "Good Time", "Gold" and "Shooting Star" from the fourth studio album, The Midsummer Station, as well as two previously unreleased tracks, "Hey Anna" and "I Hope You Think of Me". The Midsummer Station - Acoustic EP reached number 99 on the Billboard 200 in the United States.

Track listing

Charts

References

Owl City albums
2013 EPs